Xavier Brown (born February 19, 1988) is an American football defensive end. He played college football for C. W. Post, he was signed by the Hamilton Tiger-Cats of the Canadian Football League (CFL) as an undrafted free agent in 2011. He then played for the Chicago Rush and New Orleans VooDoo of the Arena Football League (AFL) from 2012 to 2014.

Professional career

Canadian Football League
Brown was signed by the Hamilton Tiger-Cats on June 6, 2011. He was released during final roster cuts on June 25, 2011.

Arena Football League
Brown was assigned to the Chicago Rush of the Arena Football League in February 2012. On May 28, 2012, he was traded to the New Orleans VooDoo for cornerback Leslie Majors.

National Football League
Brown was signed by the Philadelphia Eagles on August 4, 2012.

References

External links
Philadelphia Eagles bio
New Orleans VooDoo bio

1988 births
Living people
American football defensive ends
Canadian football defensive linemen
American players of Canadian football
LIU Post Pioneers football players
Chicago Rush players
New Orleans VooDoo players
Philadelphia Eagles players
Hamilton Tiger-Cats players